Jean-Christ Wajoka (born September 6, 1992) is a New Caledonian footballer who plays as a defender for New Caledonian side Magenta and the New Caledonia national team.

Playing career

Club career
As a member of Gaïtcha, Wajoka appeared in three matches at the 2014–15 OFC Champions League, scoring a brace against Tahitian champions Pirae and adding one more against the Samoan champs, Lupe o le Soaga.

For the next season, he made the move to Magenta, and helped them to a league title in 2016.

International career
Wajoka made his senior international debut for New Caledonia in a friendly against Vanuatu on 26 March 2016.

Wajoka was called up to represent New Caledonia at the 2016 OFC Nations Cup, which also doubled as the second round of the 2018 FIFA World Cup qualifiers for Oceania. He appeared in three matches (against Papua New Guinea, Samoa, and Tahiti, respectively) as his country finished second in their group.

National team statistics

International goals
Scores and results list New Caledonia's goal tally first.

Honours

Club
Magenta
 Super Ligue: 2016

References

External links
 
 
 Jean-Christ Wajoka at footballdatabase.eu

Living people
1992 births
New Caledonian footballers
Gaïtcha FCN players
AS Magenta players
New Caledonia international footballers
Association football defenders
2016 OFC Nations Cup players